Harmony of Difference is a studio EP by American jazz saxophonist and bandleader Kamasi Washington. It was released on September 29, 2017, through the Young Turks record label.

Harmony of Difference is a concept album, described as a "six-movement suite" in the liner notes. The sixth track on the album, "Truth," makes up nearly half the album's length, and combines the melodies and musical ideas from the first five tracks, tying them together in a dramatic finish. 

The album received considerable acclaim from critics, and the song "Truth" made several end-of-year best-of lists.

Critical reception

Harmony of Difference received general acclaim by music critics upon its release. At Metacritic, which assigns a normalized rating out of 100 to reviews from critics, the album received an average score of 81, which indicates "universal acclaim", based on 13 reviews. AllMusic critic Thom Jurek praised the album for being "chock-full of refreshing, sophisticated ideas, all balanced by an emphatic inclusiveness that engages the listener at both musical and emotional levels". Mark Richardson, executive editor of Pitchfork, awarded the album the "Best New Music" tag, lauding its "tireless ambition" and "explosively grand compositions and arrangements". Nick Roseblade of Drowned in Sound had special acclaim for album closer "Truth", calling it a "stand out moment" with "infectious pop sheen", despite its length.

In a less enthusiastic review for The Guardian, critic John Lewis found all the songs on the EP to suffer from "big, blustery, banal, unsatisfyingly static melod[ies] that [are] repeated over and over and over again, restated each time by horns, guitar, strings and choir". Lewis did, however, find praise for the "impressive band, particularly drum pairing Ronald Bruner Jr and Tony Austin, who rumble away excitedly and add a Coltrane-ish intensity to proceedings".

Accolades

Popular culture
“Truth,” the sixth and final track on the album, is featured in the final scene of the  Showtime drama Homeland, as the fate of the show’s protagonist is revealed to the audience.

Track listing

Personnel

 Kamasi Washington – tenor saxophone, band leader
 Miles Mosley – double bass
 Ronald Bruner, Jr. – drums and percussion
 Terrace Martin – alto saxophone
 Thundercat – electric bass
 Tony Austin – drums and percussion
 Brandon Coleman – keyboards
 Cameron Graves – piano
 Ryan Porter – trombone
 Igmar Thomas – trumpet
 Dontae Winslow – trumpet
 Artyom Manukyan – cello
 Peter Jacobson – cello
 Rickey Washington – flute
 Matt Haze – guitar
 Nick Mancini – vibraphone
 Andrea Whitt – viola
 Molly Rogers – viola
 Chris Woods – violin
 Jen Simone – violin
 Paul Cartwright – violin
 Tylena Renga – violin
 Doctor Dawn Norfleet – choir
 Dexter Story – choir
 Dustin Warren – choir
 Jimetta Rose Smith – choir
 Mashica Winslow – choir
 Patrice Quinn – choir
 Steven Wayne – choir
 Taylor Graves – choir
 Thalma De Freitas – choir
 Amani Washington – painting

References

2017 EPs
Kamasi Washington albums
Albums recorded at Electro-Vox Recording Studios
Young Turks (record label) albums